Taputapuatea is a commune of French Polynesia, an overseas territory of France in the Pacific Ocean. The commune of Taputapuatea is located on the island of Raiatea, in the administrative subdivision of the Leeward Islands, themselves part of the Society Islands. At the 2017 census it had a population of 4,792. The commune was named after a large marae complex which was the religious center of eastern Polynesia for roughly 1000 years. The archaeological site of Taputapuatea marae is still today the most famous landmark of Raiatea, and it was inscribed on the UNESCO World Heritage List in 2017.

Taputapuatea consists of the following associated communes:
 Avera
 Opoa
 Puohine

The administrative centre of the commune is the settlement of Avera.

References

Communes of French Polynesia
World Heritage Sites in France
World Heritage Sites in French Polynesia